"Tonight the Heartache's on Me" is a song recorded by American country music group Dixie Chicks.  It was released in April 1999 as the fifth and final single from their album Wide Open Spaces.  It was written by Mary Francis, Johnny MacRae and Bob Morrison.  Joy Lynn White previously recorded the song on her 1994 album Wild Love.

Chart performance

Year-end charts

References

1999 singles
Joy Lynn White songs
The Chicks songs
Song recordings produced by Blake Chancey
Song recordings produced by Paul Worley
Monument Records singles
Songs written by Johnny MacRae
1994 songs
Songs written by Bob Morrison (songwriter)